The National Center of Folkloric Activities is an Albanian state institution that deals with activities in the field of folklore.

History
QKVF was established by Order No.124, Dt.06.06.1994 of the Minister of Culture, Youth and Sports, in the framework of restructuring the former Central House of Popular Creativity. The institution has its own statute, approved by the Minister of Culture that includes the statutory regulations and the identifying logo used to carry out institutional activities in the field of folkloric heritage. From 1994, QKVF has organized national and typological festivals, based on scientific criteria that entertain the general public while propagating, preserving and transmitting the original character of folklore, as part of the cultural heritage of the Albanian nation. The institution maintains links with cultural associations in Albania, Kosovo, North Macedonia, Montenegro and throughout the Albanian diaspora. One of the recent innovations of QKVF was the publication of the magazine "Traces of the Albanian Soul", which reflects the national activities of folklore, as well as issues related to the organizing of folklore festivals. It also publicizes the biographies of popular artists in the service of the National Register of Folk Artists and other study materials in folklore.

References

Center
Folklore
1994 establishments in Albania
Cultural organizations based in Albania